The Gorakhpur–Yesvantpur Express is an express train belonging to North Eastern Railway zone that runs between Gorakhpur Junction and Yesvantpur Junction via Basti railway station and  Gonda Junction in India. It is currently being operated with 15015/15016 train numbers on a weekly basis.

Service

The 15015/Gorakhpur–Yesvantpur Express has an average speed of 49 km/hr and covers 2515 km in 51h 10m. The 15016/Yesvantpur–Gorakhpur Express has an average speed of 47 km/hr and covers 2515 km in 53 h 55 m.

Route and halts 

The important halts of the train are:

Coach composite

The train has standard LHB rakes with max speed of 130 km/hr. The train consists of 22 coaches:

 3 AC II Tier
 6 AC III Tier
 7 Sleeper Coaches
 4 General Unreserved
 2 End-on Generator

Traction

Both trains are hauled by a Lallaguda Loco Shed-based WAP-7 electric locomotive from Gorakhpur to Secunderabad. From Secunderabad, the trains are hauled by a Moula Al Loco Shed-based twin WDM-3A diesel locomotive until Yesvantpur and vice versa.

Direction reversal

After the completion of the Manaknagar–Aishbagh bypass line, now the train bypasses Lucknow Junction.

Notes 

15015 - Leaves Gorakhpur Junction on Monday at 06:35 Hrs and reaches Yesvantpur Junction on 3rd day at 09:45 Hrs
15016 - Leaves Yesvantpur Junction on Thursday at 07:30 Hrs and reaches Gorakhpur Junction on 3rd day at 13:30 Hrs

See also 

 Yesvantpur Junction railway station
 Gorakhpur Junction railway station
 Gorakhpur–Yesvantpur Express (via Faizabad)
 Gorakhpur–Yesvantpur Express

References

External links 

 15015/Gorakhpur–Yesvantpur Express (via Gonda)
 15016/Yesvantpur–Gorakhpur Express (via Gonda)

Transport in Bangalore
Express trains in India
Passenger trains originating from Gorakhpur
Rail transport in Madhya Pradesh
Rail transport in Maharashtra
Rail transport in Telangana
Rail transport in Andhra Pradesh
Rail transport in Karnataka